Arbuckle railway station served the village of Arbuckle in the Scottish county of North Lanarkshire. The station was the meeting point of two early railway companies.

History

The station was the meeting point of the two pioneer railways, the Slamannan Railway and the Ballochney Railway, and joined the Monklands Railway when they amalgamated to form it in 1848. The Monklands railway was in 1865 absorbed by the Edinburgh and Glasgow Railway, joining the North British Railway a day later. By the time of these events however the station had closed, in 1862.

References 
 

Disused railway stations in North Lanarkshire
Railway stations in Great Britain opened in 1840
Railway stations in Great Britain closed in 1862